Eugenijus Gentvilas (born 14 March 1960 in Telšiai) is a Lithuanian politician, signatory of the Act of the Re-Establishment of the State of Lithuania and Member of the European Parliament for the Liberal and Centre Union (Liberal Movement since 2006), sitting with the Alliance of Liberals and Democrats for Europe. He was mayor of Klaipėda from 1997 to 2001. In mid-2001, Gentvilas briefly acted as Prime Minister of Lithuania.

External links 

Mayors of places in Lithuania
Politicians from Klaipėda
1960 births
Living people
Samogitian Roman Catholics
Prime Ministers of Lithuania
MEPs for Lithuania 2004–2009
Liberal Movement (Lithuania) MEPs
Liberal and Centre Union politicians
Liberal Union of Lithuania politicians
People from Telšiai
Ministers of Economy of Lithuania
BC Neptūnas
Members of the Seimas
Vilnius University alumni
Signatories of the Act of the Re-Establishment of the State of Lithuania